Andrey Vladimirovich Kelin (born 15 May 1957) is a Russian diplomat. He has served in various diplomatic roles since the 1970s, and has been the incumbent Ambassador of Russia to the United Kingdom since November 2019.

Born in 1957, Kelin embarked on a diplomatic career, joining the Ministry of Foreign Affairs in 1979. He served in various posts in embassies in Europe, and took part in arms-limitation talks and then in the ministry's department of Pan-European Cooperation. After a period as Deputy Permanent Representative of the Russian Federation to NATO and then representative to the Organization for Security and Co-operation in Europe, Kelin eventually rose to be in charge of the Department of Pan-European Cooperation in 2015. In 2019, he was appointed Ambassador of Russia to the United Kingdom. He holds several awards, including the Order of Honour, the Order of Friendship, and the Medal of the Order "For Merit to the Fatherland" Second Class.

Early life and career
Born on 15 May 1957, Kelin studied at the Faculty of International Journalism at Moscow State Institute of International Relations, and joined the Ministry of Foreign Affairs in 1979. His early work was in various positions in the ministry, and in overseas embassies, including the Netherlands, Switzerland, and Belgium. He speaks Russian, English, French and Dutch.

Kelin's first overseas posting was to the Soviet embassy in the Netherlands, from 1979 until 1983. He was part of the Soviet delegation to the Geneva talks in the early 1980s, ultimately resulting in the Intermediate-Range Nuclear Forces Treaty in 1987. He had a second overseas posting between 1990 and 1995 at the Soviet, and later Russian, embassy in Belgium. Between 1995 and 1998, Kelin served as a head of department at the Department of Pan-European Cooperation in the Ministry of Foreign Affairs, and then from 1998 to 2003 he was Deputy Permanent Representative of the Russian Federation to NATO. The permanent representative at this time was Sergey Kislyak.

Permanent representative and ambassadorship
In 2003, Kelin became Deputy Director of the Department of Pan-European Cooperation, and then from September 2005 served as Director of the Fourth Department of the Commonwealth of Independent States countries.  He was part of the Russian delegation to the Geneva International Discussions on Security and Stability in the Transcaucasus. On 7 June 2011, he took up the post of Permanent Representative of the Russian Federation to the Organization for Security and Co-operation in Europe, succeeding Anvar Azimov. Part of his brief was the continuing discussions on peaceful settlements in the Transcaucasian region. He was recalled on 5 August 2015, and on 21 September 2015 he was appointed Director of the Department of Pan-European Cooperation. On 5 November 2019, Kelin was appointed Ambassador of Russia to the United Kingdom. He succeeded Alexander Yakovenko, who had been recalled in August.

On 20 June 2022, Kelin received a personal ban on entering the Westminster Parliamentary Estate.

Rank and awards
Kelin holds the diplomatic rank of Ambassador Extraordinary and Plenipotentiary, to which he was appointed on 14 November 2012. Over his career he has been awarded the Order of Honour on 24 October 2017, the Order of Friendship on 18 August 2009, and the Medal of the Order "For Merit to the Fatherland" Second Class in 1998.

References 

1957 births
Living people
Moscow State Institute of International Relations alumni
Ambassador Extraordinary and Plenipotentiary (Russian Federation)
Ambassadors of Russia to the United Kingdom
Permanent Representatives of Russia to the Organization for Security and Co-operation in Europe
Recipients of the Order of Honour (Russia)
Recipients of the Medal of the Order "For Merit to the Fatherland" II class